The first Tăriceanu cabinet was the cabinet of the government of Romania led by former PNL leader Călin Popescu-Tăriceanu between 29 December 2004 and 5 April 2007. It succeeded the Năstase cabinet and was succeeded by the second Tăriceanu cabinet.

It was a coalition government which was formed by the National Liberal Party (PNL), the Democratic Party (PD), the Democratic Alliance of Hungarians in Romania (UDMR), and the Romanian Humanist Party/Conservative Party (PUR/PC).

Additionally, it also consisted of three Ministers of State (one for each party of the coalition, except for the National Liberal Party, which held the position of Prime Minister), 15 Ministers, and 6 Ministers Delegate.

In early December 2006, the Conservative Party withdrew from the coalition.
 As a result, the Conservative Party's Minister Delegate post was dissolved and the other Conservative Party's posts were re-shuffled between the National Liberal Party (PNL) and the Democratic Party (PD).

References

Cabinets of Romania
2004 establishments in Romania
2007 disestablishments in Romania
Cabinets established in 2004
Cabinets disestablished in 2007